Werner W. Wallroth (28 February 1930 – 9 August 2011) was a German film director and screenwriter. He directed sixteen films between 1961 and 1991. His 1983 film Zille and Me was entered into the 13th Moscow International Film Festival.

Selected filmography
 Hauptmann Florian von der Mühle (1968)
 Seine Hoheit – Genosse Prinz (1969)
 Blood Brothers (1975)
 Zille and Me (1983)

References

External links

1930 births
2011 deaths
Film people from Thuringia
Mass media people from Erfurt